Sébastien Destremau (born 24 August 1964 in Plancoët, Côtes d'Armor) is a professional sailor and sailing journalist of both French and Australian nationality.

Career

A veteran with five America's Cup campaigns, multiple world championships and several campaigns in the Olympic classes. He then moved on to Oceanic sailing competing in the 2016-2017 Vendee Globe and the 2020–2021 Vendée Globe.

Significant results

References

External links
 
 

1964 births
Living people
Sportspeople from Côtes-d'Armor
Volvo Ocean Race sailors
French male sailors (sport)
IMOCA 60 class sailors
Australian Vendee Globe sailors
French Vendee Globe sailors
2016 Vendee Globe sailors
2020 Vendee Globe sailors
Vendée Globe finishers